Caillou is a Canadian educational children's television series which aired on Teletoon (both English and French versions) - with the first episode airing on the former channel on September 15, 1997 - until the fourth season. After that, it moved to Treehouse TV,for season five. The series finale aired on October 3, 2010. It also airs on the PBS Kids Channel.

Based on the books by Hélène Desputeaux, it focuses on a four-year-old boy named Caillou who is fascinated by the world around him. The series was produced in Canada by the CINAR Corporation (later Cookie Jar Entertainment), while the fifth and final season was produced in association with the South African studio Clockwork Zoo.

The show is being followed by a computer-animated reboot series, set to premiere on Peacock in 2023 and with 52 11-minute episodes.

Plot
Caillou lives with his mother, father, and younger sister, Rosie. He has many adventures with his family and friends, and uses his imagination in every episode.

Each episode in seasons 1 through 3 has a theme and is divided into several short sections that mix animation, puppet skits, and video of live-action children in real-life situations. In seasons 4 and 5, the episodes are divided into three short sections; the puppet segment was dropped, alongside the "Real Kids" version of the segment.

During the first season, many of the stories in the animated version began with a grandmother (who is also the show's narrator) introducing the story to her grandchildren, then reading the story from a book. Starting in the second season, the narrator and grandmother is an unseen character.

Characters

Major characters

Caillou
Caillou (meaning pebble or stone in French), nicknamed by himself The Prince of Imagination, is the title character of the show. Caillou was first voiced by Bryn McAuley from 1997 to 2000, then Jaclyn Linetsky in 2000 until 2003, and then, due to Linetsky's death, Annie Bovaird from 2003 to 2010. Caillou was first shown in the episode "Caillou Makes Cookies", which aired in 1997.

Caillou is an imaginative four-year-old boy with a love for forms of transportive machinery such as rocket ships and airplanes. A dreamer, Caillou is inclined to frequent dream sequences in some episodes, visualizing his daydreams and wishes, and many episodes describe his normal daily experiences with his parents, friends, and neighbours. Caillou particularly loves his stuffed dinosaur, Rexy, and teddy bear, Teddy, along with his pet cat Gilbert, all of whom are depicted as puppets in segments featured in the earlier episodes.

Caillou's family

 Rosie (French name: Mousseline) – Caillou's lively younger sister who is a typical toddler. She is two years old. She always wants to take part in the same activities as Caillou. In later seasons of the series, she becomes more talkative and independent. She wears a blue dress, red socks and blue Mary Jane shoes. Rosie fights with Caillou for some reasons, but they still love each other. She appears to be the only family member with red hair. Rosie was first voiced by Brigid Tierney, then Jesse Vinet.
 Doris/Mommy – Caillou's mother. She is a busy homemaker most of the time but is seen to work in an office, as well. Caillou occasionally helps his mother with different chores, and she often takes time to involve Caillou and his friends in activities such as crafts and baking. She is predominantly dressed in a red blouse with yellow trim, blue headband, ankle-length blue jeans and blue shoes with green soles. Voiced by Jennifer Seguin.
 Boris/Daddy – Caillou's father. He wears a green sweater with a red trim with blue jeans. In the episode "Caillou The Chef" he says he once worked at a restaurant and made pizza. He and Caillou occasionally work on projects around the house together. He is voiced by Pat Fry.
 Gilbert – Caillou's pet cat. In the puppet segments, he is shown to be knowledgeable about things which are foreign to Rexy and Teddy.
 Grandma – Caillou's paternal grandmother. Grandma is a very active lady who loves the arts and the outdoors. She passes that love onto Caillou. Grandma often comes up with creative ideas to solve Caillou's problems. She and Caillou paint and go bird-watching together. Voiced by Pauline Little.
 Grandpa – Caillou's paternal grandfather. He takes Caillou on adventures, often going on walks and riding the bus throughout the town where they reside. In "Caillou's Hiding Place", he showed Caillou a hidden area inside a tree in the backyard. In the episode "Caillou Goes Camping", he and Caillou camp in the backyard. He is Daddy's father and loves to tell stories about when Calliou's father was a little boy. He wears a blue shirt. Voiced by George Morris.

Caillou's friends and neighbours
 Mr. Hinkle (French name: Monsieur Lajoie) – Caillou's neighbour, introduced in the 1998 episode "Caillou's Not Afraid Anymore". He has a gold tooth. In the episode "Farmer for the Day", it is stated that his first name is Paul.

 Leo – A boy who started out as a bully in the 1999 episode "Caillou at Daycare", but quickly befriended Caillou in the same episode. They have been inseparable since. He is of Jewish faith and celebrates Hanukkah (stated in Caillou's Holiday Movie). Voiced by Johanne Garneau from 1997 to 2003, Vince Davies in Caillou's Holiday Movie, Jonathan Koensgen from 2006 to 2008 and Graeme Jokic in 2010.
 Clementine – Clementine was the first to befriend Caillou in the 1999 episode "Caillou Goes to Day Care". She can get rather bossy for some reasons, but all in all she is pretty understanding. She is of African-Canadian descent. Caillou has a crush on her as, indicated in Caillou's Valentines, Season 4, Episode 8. She is voiced by Brigid Tierney, and then Sophie Uretsky.
 Sarah – Caillou's friend whom he first met in "Caillou Goes Around the Block". She is of Chinese descent and celebrates Chinese New Year. She has a cousin in an episode where she invites Caillou to celebrate Chinese New Year. In another she invites him to school for "Bring Your Younger Siblings to School Day" because she has no siblings. Sarah has a pet cat named Olly and a dog named Murphy. Sarah is voiced by Amanda Tilson.
 André – An redheaded boy, André is introduced in the episode "Caillou's Big Friend" and usually wears red sandals. According to the song "Days of the Week" released on the Caillou music CD Caillou and Friends, Caillou plays with him every Saturday. André enjoys biking and soccer.
 Julie – Caillou's and Rosie's teenage babysitter. She has blonde hair in a ponytail, and enjoys playing with Caillou and Rosie. Voiced by Holly Gauthier-Frankel.
 Jason and Jeffrey – Identical twin brothers who are of Hispanic descent. They both enjoy eating pizza. Initially, they wore identical clothes. By Season 4, though, Jason began wearing a shirt with inverted colours so it's easier to tell them apart. They are both in Caillou's playschool class. The first episode they appeared in was "New House, New Neighbors".
 Billy – Clementine's older brother. He is usually seen playing in a band with his friends or playing sports. Voiced by Michael Caloz in Season 1.
 Miss Martin – Caillou's preschool teacher. She has red hair and wears red overalls with a long-sleeved white shirt. According to the episode "A Surprise for Ms. Martin" her birthday is in June. Her first name is Ann; this was stated in "Caillou Goes to Daycare". Voiced by Ellen David.
 Jonas – Boris' friend from before he met Doris. He lives on a ranch and has a horse named Lucky. Jonas appears in four episodes and in Caillou's Holiday Movie. Voiced by Brian Wrench. 
 Emma – A girl in Caillou's playschool class who dislikes loud noises, wearing red. It is stated in an episode that she has Type 1 Diabetes.
 Xavier – A boy in Caillou's playschool class who has brown hair and wears blue overalls.

The puppets
The puppet segments were used only on the PBS broadcasts of Caillou from 2000 to 2003 as continuity to fill time usually taken up by commercial breaks during the original Teletoon broadcasts; later episodes on PBS did not include the puppet segment continuity.

 Gilbert – Caillou's pet cat. He is the leader of the group. He has greyish-blue fur with black stripes and loathes dogs with a passion. He especially dislikes the bulldog in the neighbourhood. In the puppet segments of the show, Gilbert often consists odes. Puppeteered by Bob Stutt. 
 Rexy – Caillou's toy dinosaur. Bluish in colour and speaks in a somewhat foreign accent, he is very playful. Rexy has the incapability to give a "good" hug. Rexy is noted for being rather pedantic. He is often teased about his speech impediment, and tends to react violently to any mention of it. Puppeteered by Pier Parquette and voiced by Rick Jones.
 Teddy – An old teddy bear that once belonged to Caillou's father, and now belongs to Caillou, Teddy is reasonable and nice. He is somewhat pessimistic, but all in all, he just needs a hug. Puppeteered by Frank Meschkuleit.
 Deedee – A brown squirrel, she has a bushy tail, and is often seen playing with Rexy. Deedee first appeared as a baby squirrel when Rexy found on the ground lost from her family. Deedee lives in Caillou's backyard where most of the puppet segments take place. She was never appeared in Season 3. Puppeteered by Wendy Welch.

Episodes
Caillou consists of five seasons of 92 half-hour episodes, as well as the 90-minute Christmas film Caillou's Holiday Movie.

Production
Caillou books have been published by Chouette Publishing Inc. since 1989.

The series was originally broadcast in French in Canada, and the episodes were later translated into English. The original books were also in French. Caillou was designed primarily for toddlers. It was created by child developmental psychologists. In 1997, 65 five-minute episodes of Caillou were aired in Canada and in selected markets worldwide, including the US. In 2000 there were 40 30-minute episodes of the show, containing a mixture of the five-minute episodes plus new stories, songs, real kids segment and puppets. This was followed by another 16 30-minute episodes containing all-new stories in 2003. The film Caillou's Holiday Movie was released on October 7, 2003. On April 3, 2006, a new set of 20 episodes finally premiered after a three-year hiatus. Caillou started attending preschool and there were new themes and a new opening. The show was renewed for a second and third season in 2003, and later a fourth season. The fifth season was animated by South Africa-based studio Clockwork Zoo

On November 14, 2012, the fourth season of the series was pre-sold to PBS Kids in the United States

Reception and controversy

Critical response
Caillou initially received generally positive reviews from television critics and parents of young children. The staff of Entertainment Weekly wrote, "Embellishing everything he sees with his rich imagination." The New York Times wrote "Caillou looks at the world through the eyes of its 4-year-old namesake" while Lynne Heffley of the Los Angeles Times wrote, "Caillou grows and learns to make sense of his world."

Controversy
As the years progressed, however, the show drew criticism due to first and second seasons, and some episodes of the third season that taught them wrong lessons. In a National Post, writer Tristin Hopper identified Caillou to be "quite possibly the world's most universally reviled children's program." A common criticism towards the series is the titular character behaving like a spoiled child, and the lack of consequences given within the parent characters. The most infamous example of Caillou's bad behavior is in the episode Caillou Joins the Circus, where Caillou finds out that the circus is tomorrow when he thought it was today and he threw a temper tantrum over it. Another infamous episode, Big Brother Caillou features Caillou being very jealous that his baby sister Rosie is getting all the attention of their parents, so he pinches Rosie, which most considered to be an minor improvement over the original book the episode was based on where Caillou bit Rosie. When the show started airing on Cartoonito in 2021, the pinching scene was cut out.

Hopper once said: "Unlike most children's programming, Caillou makes almost no attempt to educate its young audience. There are no veiled math problems, spelling lessons or morality tales; it's just calm, non-threatening, bright-coloured people navigating everyday tasks." These criticisms of the show's titular character have been echoed on online platforms. Last Week Tonight host John Oliver referenced Caillou in a comparison of boring things against net neutrality, going on to insult Caillou for its themes.

As Caillou appeared as a much younger child in the original line of children's books, he originally had no hair. When illustrators found that adding hair made him look unrecognizable, it was decided that Caillou would never have hair. This decision led to an internet meme asserting that the protagonist has cancer or pediatric alopecia.

Due to the controversy surrounding Caillou, this has also started "Grounded" videos out of Caillou, usually in Vyond (formerly GoAnimate.)

Broadcast
Caillou first aired on Canada's French-language Télétoon channel on September 15, 1997, and was the first show aired on the English-language Teletoon when it launched on October 17, 1997. The series was moved to Treehouse TV in 2010. Caillou made its US debut on PBS Kids on September 4, 2000, and ran on that network until December 27, 2020. Reruns started airing on PBS Kids Sprout (later known as simply Sprout) on its launch on September 26, 2005. While Sprout rebranded into Universal Kids on September 9, 2017, the show remained on the channel until it was taken off the line-up at the beginning of April 2019.

On January 5, 2021, PBS Kids announced on Twitter that they would no longer broadcast reruns of Caillou. Deadline Hollywood reported that many parents and viewers are celebrating the news of the cancellation decision, who have complained with Caillou teaching their kids bad lessons for being bratty and whiny. On August 16, 2021, it was announced that Cartoon Network had acquired the US-broadcast rights to the show after PBS' rights expired, with reruns of the series airing on Cartoonito from September 13, 2021 to May 4, 2022 in its HD remastered form. PBS ultimately sold the rights for US$6.4 million. In Canada, Family Jr. continues to broadcast reruns since February 5, 2018. PBS Kids currently retains the physical media and streaming rights for the original series. Comcast/NBCUniversal acquired global streaming rights for the reboot series (via Peacock) as of 2022.

Home video releases
In the United States, Caillou videocassettes and DVDs have been released by PBS Distribution (Originally distributed through Warner Home Video until 2004, and then Paramount Home Entertainment from 2006 to 2010, and now self-distributed). From 2003 to 2006, the DVDs with puppets and Jaclyn Linetsky were compilations from 2003 through 2006, and one of them is in memory of Linetsky herself.

For the franchise's 25th anniversary, a DVD/book combo pack reissue of Caillou's Family Favorites was released on October 14, 2014, by PBS Distribution, while a DVD reissue of Caillou's Holiday Movie was released on November 11, 2014 by NCircle Entertainment.

In Canada, Sony Wonder originally released Caillou on VHS and DVD, and after the closure of the division by Sony, were moved to Vivendi Entertainment Canada. Since 2012, Caillou DVDs are distributed by Entertainment One and after their purchase of Phase 4 Films in 2015, are released through the KaBoom Entertainment label.

Music from the series
In 2003, an album titled Caillou's Favorite Songs was released by Kid Rhino under the Cinar Music imprint.

Revival

YouTube series
Beginning in late 2016, a new Caillou web series for YouTube premiered on the official Caillou channel and was later released onto Amazon Prime. These shorts are mainly remakes of older episodes and are produced by WildBrain Spark Studios, a subsidiary of WildBrain that produces original content for their WildBrain Spark network. However, the videos were not made available to YouTube users in the United States until 2021.

In August 2021, it was announced that Cartoon Network licensed the series for broadcast on US television.

Reboot and specials
In September 2021, WildBrain announced the production of five new 45-minute specials based on the franchise for Family Jr. These specials are the first Caillou related media to be produced in CGI animation, and will focus on Christmas, Halloween, Family Day, Summer Vacation and National Anti-Bullying Day. The specials will be produced by WildBrain Studios, with animation provided by IoM Media Ventures.

In June 2022, WildBrain announced they teamed with Comcast's streaming platform, Peacock, to produce a new series of the show, consisting of 52 11-minute episodes to go along with those specials. It is set to premiere in 2023, with IoM also providing animation production as the specials are.

The first special: Rosie the Giant, which focuses on the effects of bullying, simultaneously premiered in Canada and the United States on Family Jr. and Peacock respectively on July 10, 2022.

The second special: Adventures with Grandma and Grandpa, which focuses on Caillou visiting his grandparents for a sleepover at their beach house, premiered on Peacock on August 25, 2022.

References

External links
 Caillou on Treehouse
 Official Caillou Website
 WildBrain
 Official Caillou Website (French)
 Chouette publishing (publishers of Caillou)
 
 
 Hélène Desputeaux official site

1990s Canadian animated television series
2000s Canadian animated television series
2010s Canadian animated television series
2020s Canadian animated television series
1990s Canadian children's television series
2000s Canadian children's television series
2010s Canadian children's television series
2020s Canadian children's television series
1990s preschool education television series
2000s preschool education television series
2010s preschool education television series
2020s preschool education television series
1997 Canadian television series debuts
2010 Canadian television series endings
Animated preschool education television series
Animation controversies in television
Canadian children's animated television series
Canadian flash animated television series
Canadian preschool education television series
Canadian television series with live action and animation
Canadian television shows based on children's books
Canadian television shows featuring puppetry
English-language television shows
PBS Kids shows
Teletoon original programming
Treehouse TV original programming
Cartoon Network original programming
Cartoonito original programming
Peacock (streaming service) original programming
Animated television series about children
Animated television series about families
Television controversies in the United States
Television controversies in Canada
Television shows filmed in Quebec
Television shows set in Quebec
Television series by Cookie Jar Entertainment
Television series by DHX Media
Canadian television series revived after cancellation
Film and television memes